Izzat Hussain is an Indian television chef and Unani physician. Hussain cooks Mughlai, Awadhi and Lakhnawi cuisine.

Early life 
Hussain was born in Lucknow, the capital city of Uttar Pradesh, India, and spent most of his childhood in Kanpur and Lucknow. He graduated in 1984 with a bachelor's degree from UNANI Medical, Kanpur.

Career 
Hussain is a Unani physician, a chef, an author of cookbooks and a restaurant consultant.

He started his career as a doctor in a Charitable Hospital in Lucknow, Uttar Pradesh. Hussain began his culinary career as a freelancer chef in India after working in many five-star hotels. He is the recipient of the Best Mughlai Chef of India Award by G-Plus Guwahati Food Awards 2015 at Guwahati by G-Plus Culinary. He is also the brand ambassador for Izzat Pasand, a brand of Dry Onions & Flakes in India.

Hussain's first TV show is QUEST on Traveller XP. He also launched his own Food Consultancy with "Sheesh Mahal Kitchens".

Personal life 
Hussain belongs to the royal family of Awadh and is related to the last Nawab of Awadh, Wajid Ali Shah. Hussain is married. He has a daughter and sons.

Izzat Ka Khana: Mughlai Cuisine Recipes 

Hussain wrote "Izzat Ka Khana: Mughlai Cuisine Recipes", a book which he states is "a composition of recipes that are stated to be beneficial for the human body, as food is a source of energy". The recipes in this book include medicinal preparations of selected herbal and beneficial spices, including fruits and vegetables which are used in Unani and herbal practices.

Culinary shows

Izzat Husain has appeared on TV shows with Channel WIN, Travelers XP, and many International food and travel channels.

 He is well known for providing his consultancy to establish new restaurants and hospitals, and food services along with giving ideas of interior decoration, sitting arrangements purchasing and set up of artistic crockery as per the theme and need of restaurants and caterers.
 Hussain renders Cooking Trainings of authentic special Mughlai (Royal Awadhi, Lakhnawi) food coach, teaching kitchen staff at hotels kitchens and workshops such as Rivaayat and OCLD.
 Positioning Food promotion shows in various five star properties, Chef Izzat has appeared at food shows with Oberoi Group, Trident Gurgaon, Trident BKC, Radisson Guwahati, Radisson Ranchi, Park Plaza Kolkata and Clarks Shimla.
 Handling huge quantities of food of multi-cuisine for parties with quality as well as determining quantity of food, portions and estimating cuisine requirements and costs. Monitoring and positioning of pre booked catering food.

References

 https://www.zomato.com/mumbai/maya-trident-bandra-kurla-complex
 https://web.archive.org/web/20160630030207/http://www.passionateaboutbaking.com/2015/01/food-feature-rivaayat-royal-indian-experience-saffron-trident-gurgaon-murgh-hara-pyaz-recipe-chef-izzat-hussain.html
 
 
 http://epaperbeta.timesofindia.com/Article.aspx?eid=31812&articlexml=Food-should-have-healing-power-Awadhi-chef-23112015002034

External links
https://plus.google.com/+DrIzzatHusainLucknow

Year of birth missing (living people)
Living people
Indian television chefs